The 1926–27 Idaho Vandals men's basketball team represented the University of Idaho during the  NCAA college basketball season. Members of the Pacific Coast Conference, the Vandals were led by seventh-year head coach  and played their home games on campus at the Armory and Gymnasium in Moscow, Idaho.

After the season, MacMillan departed for Minnesota of the Big Ten Conference, and was succeeded by alumnus Rich Fox, who coached Pocatello High School to the state title in 1927 (over Moscow in Moscow) and led the Vandals for nine seasons.

This was the penultimate season for varsity basketball at the Armory and Gymnasium as the Memorial Gymnasium opened in November 1928. The older building became the women's gym, and continues today as Art and Architecture South.

References

External links
Sports Reference – Idaho Vandals: 1926–27 basketball season
Gem of the Mountains: 1927 University of Idaho yearbook – 1926–27 basketball season
Idaho Argonaut – student newspaper – 1927 editions

Idaho Vandals men's basketball seasons
Idaho
Idaho
Idaho